is a Japanese light novel series written by Kaisei Enomoto and illustrated by Shugao. It was serialized online between June 2017 and June 2020 on the user-generated novel publishing website Shōsetsuka ni Narō. It was later acquired by Kadokawa Shoten, who have published three volumes from February 2018 to October 2019 under their Kadokawa Sneaker Bunko imprint. A manga adaptation with art by Kōichi Muro was serialized in Square Enix's shōnen manga magazine Monthly Gangan Joker from January 2018 to November 2019. It was collected in five tankōbon volumes. An original net (ONA) anime adaptation by Studio LAN aired in Chinese on Bilibili from July to October 2022, with the Japanese dub premiering on television in January 2023.

Characters

Media

Light novel
The series written by Kaisei Enomoto was serialized online between June 2017 and June 2020 on the user-generated novel publishing website Shōsetsuka ni Narō. It was later acquired by Kadokawa Shoten, who have published three light novel volumes with illustrations by Shugao from February 1, 2018 to October 1, 2019 under their Kadokawa Sneaker Bunko imprint.

Manga
A manga adaptation with art by Kōichi Muro was serialized in Square Enix's shōnen manga magazine Monthly Gangan Joker from January 22, 2018, to November 22, 2019. It was collected in five tankōbon volumes.

Anime
On November 21, 2021, a Japanese-Chinese original net (ONA) anime adaptation produced by Bilibili and animated by Studio LAN was announced. It is directed by Liu Siwen and written by Siwen and Li Jiajie. The Chinese dub aired on Bilibili from July 30 to October 8, 2022, while the Japanese dub premiered on television on January 6, 2023 on AT-X, Tokyo MX, and BS Fuji. Crunchyroll licensed the series outside of Asia.

Episode list

References

External links
 at Shōsetsuka ni Narō 
 
 
 
 at Bilibili 

2018 Japanese novels
2022 anime ONAs
2023 anime television series debuts
Anime and manga based on light novels
Crunchyroll anime
Gangan Comics manga
Kadokawa Sneaker Bunko
Light novels
Light novels first published online
Shōnen manga
Shōsetsuka ni Narō
Works about dragons